The Chateau at Klášterec nad Ohří is a chateau on the left bank of the Ohře River, in the northwestern part of the historical region of Bohemia. It is in Klášterec nad Ohří of the Ústí nad Labem Region in the Czech Republic. The chateau complex, acquired in 1621 by the Thun und Hohenstein family, is a prominent landmark in the town's recently restored historic urban conservation area.

Setting
The chateau is set in an extensive landscape park, with 220 tree species, some rare from around the world. The park features a Baroque style sala terrena pavilion, with a gloriette mezzanine decorated with architectural sculptures by Jan Brokoff (1680s).

The park's northern section has an installation of the Stations of the Cross (1690s) and the Church of the Holy Trinity with the Crypt of the Thun Noble Family.

Museum
The Chateau at Klášterec nad Ohří exhibits an extensive porcelain collection from the Museum of Decorative Arts in Prague.
It includes
Bohemian and Czech Porcelain
Occupying 21 rooms on the chateau's first floor, the collection of Bohemian and Czech porcelain documents the more than 200-year-old history of porcelain manufacturing in Bohemia. The historical showcases and interiors feature the output of porcelain factories in Slavkov, Klášterec nad Ohří, Březová, Kisibl, Chodov, Stará Role, Dalovice, Prague, Loket, Budov and Ždanov.
Early Far Eastern and European Porcelain Manufacturing
The display presents a selection of early porcelain produced in China and Japan, as well as Meissen, Vienna and Nymphenburg between the 17th and 19th centuries.

See also
Chateau at Kamenice nad Lipou
Museum of Textile in Česká Skalice
Josef Sudek Gallery

External links
Museum of Decorative Arts in Prague official website

Art museums and galleries in the Czech Republic
Museums in the Ústí nad Labem Region
Parks in the Czech Republic
Baroque castle in the Czech Republic
Ceramics museums
Castles in the Ústí nad Labem Region
Chomutov District